The geger is a percussion instrument used in the traditional music of Jammu and Kashmir. It consists in a brass or metal vessel similar to the clay nout.

The geger is usually placed on the lap of the performer, or on the floor, with the mouth facing up. The performer uses the fingers, thumbs, palms, or a ring on the fingers or thumbs, to strike its outer surface, to produce different sounds. Different tones can be produced by hitting areas of the vessel as body, neck and mouth, with different parts of the hands.

References
 The Garland Encyclopedia of World Music: South Asia : the Indian subcontinent.(1999).  Routledge.

External links
Video - Singer playing geger

Indian musical instruments
Idiophones
Metal percussion instruments